Jesús Javier Corpas Mauleón is a Spanish writer born in Estella, Navarre, Spain. Author of numerous works published in the Spanish journals Historia Militar, Serga, Medioevo, and Calle Mayor, since August 2013 he has been a member of the scientific board of the prestigious Hispanic-American journal La Razón Histórica.

He is the author of the following books:
 Guerreros: Historias de mil años ("Warriors: Stories from One Thousand Years")
 La quinta carta ("The Fifth Letter")
 Los espartanos australes ("The Southern Spartans")
 Por montes y valles ("Over Hill and Dale")

He has appeared on various television and radio programs, moderated panel discussions, given conferences. He has been judge for the Festival of San Fermín awards. In recognition of his body of work, which includes novels, stories, and essays, he been made a Knight of Santiago and received the Cross of Honor of the European Defense Forces.

References
Diario El Mundo, domingo 9-2-2014 El Cultural Beatríz Rucabado
 Diário de Notícias 2012-05-20, page 41, Fernando Hualde
 Diario de Navarra 2012-04-27 page 56, 2012-05-06
 Diario de Navarra, article by Ollarra in his column "Desde el Gallo de San Cernin", 2012-11-10, page 29
 Diario La Nueva España, 2012-06-30, page 6 report by E.V. e Ignacio Pulido
 Diario La Cámara, interview of 2013-05-05
 El Semanal Digital articles by Pascual Tamburri on 2012-04-25 and 2011-11-30
 Calle Mayor magazine, No. 498, 2011-08-06, Nos. 496, 475, 465
 Serga magazine issues 82 and 84
 Spanish Journal of Military History issue 124
 Razón Histórica journal No. 23, July 2013, No. 24 September 2013
 Televisión Intereconomía, programme "Con otro enfoque", 2012-06-20 interview by J.J. Esparza
 ABC Punto Radio, interview Jesús Araiz, 2013-05-08
 Diario de Navarra, 2012-04-27 p. 56

Spanish male writers
21st-century Spanish historians
People from Estella Oriental